The Tallahassee Rebels were a short-lived professional minor league baseball team based Tallahassee, Florida in . The club was a member of the Class B Florida International League. During their lone season, the Rebels posted a dismal 22-76, for last place in the six team league.

Notable alumni
Don Plarski
Jose Zardon

References
BR Tallahassee Rebels

Defunct minor league baseball teams
Defunct baseball teams in Florida
Baseball teams established in 1954
Baseball teams disestablished in 1954
1954 establishments in Florida
1954 disestablishments in Florida
Sports in Tallahassee, Florida